Archaic  is a period of time preceding a designated classical period, or something from an older period of time that is also not found or used currently:

List of archaeological periods
Archaic Sumerian language, spoken between 31st - 26th centuries BC in Mesopotamia (Classical Sumerian is from 26th - 23rd centuries BC).
Archaic Greece
Archaic period in the Americas
Early Dynastic Period of Egypt
Archaic Homo sapiens, people who lived  about 300,000 to 30,000 B.P. (this is far earlier than the archaeological definition) 
Archaism, speech or writing in a form that is no longer current
Archaic language, one that preserves features that are no longer present in other languages of the same language family
List of archaic musical instruments
Archaic Latin (also called Old Latin or Early Latin), Latin language up to about 75 BC

Archaic may also refer to:

Archaic (comics), a comic-book series created by writer James Abrams and artist Brett Marting